Ado Anderkopp (18 January 1894, Hanila – 30 June 1941 Tallinn) was an Estonian politician, journalist and sport personnel. He was a member of I, II, III, IV and V Riigikogu.

Following the Soviet occupation of Estonia in 1940, Anderkopp was arrested on 22 July 1940. He was executed in prison in Tallinn on 30 June 1941.

Political offices:
 1923-1924: Minister of War
 1930-1933: Minister of the Interior and Minister of Justice

References

1894 births
1941 deaths
People from Lääneranna Parish
People from Kreis Wiek
Estonian Labour Party politicians
National Centre Party (Estonia) politicians
Patriotic League (Estonia) politicians
Ministers of the Interior of Estonia
Government ministers of Estonia
Members of the Estonian Constituent Assembly
Members of the Riigikogu, 1920–1923
Members of the Riigikogu, 1923–1926
Members of the Riigikogu, 1926–1929
Members of the Riigikogu, 1929–1932
Members of the Riigikogu, 1932–1934
Members of the Estonian National Assembly
Members of the Riigivolikogu
Estonian journalists
Estonian editors
University of Tartu alumni
Recipients of the Order of the White Star, 2nd Class
Recipients of the Military Order of the Cross of the Eagle
Estonian people executed by the Soviet Union